The commune of Gatara is a commune of Kayanza Province in northern Burundi. The capital lies at Gatara.

References

Communes of Burundi
Kayanza Province